Malakoff is a city in Henderson County, Texas, United States. The population was 2,179 at the 2020 census. The city is named after a Russian fort of Malakoff (Malakhov kurgan), which played a pivotal role during the siege of Sevastopol during the Crimean War.

History 
The community was formerly known as "Caney Creek" and "Mitcham Chapel". An application for a named post office in 1854 under "Purdam" or "Mitcham" resulted in the current name, because the other names were already in use. In the 1920s coal mining became an important activity. The "Malakoff Man", a large prehistoric carved head found in the 1930s, resembles a carving of the Olmec culture.

Geography

Malakoff is located in western Henderson County at  (32.178182, –96.018264). Texas State Highway 31 runs through the center of the city, leading east  to Athens and west  to Corsicana. Texas State Highway 198 leads north from the center of Malakoff  to Mabank.

Demographics

As of the 2020 United States census, there were 2,179 people, 938 households, and 624 families residing in the city.

As of the census of 2000, there were 2,257 people, 874 households, and 566 families residing in the city. The population density was 804.4 people per square mile (310.1/km). There were 1,036 housing units at an average density of 369.2 per square mile (142.3/km). The racial makeup of the city was 72.49% White, 21.98% African American, 0.49% Native American, 0.13% Asian, 0.13% Pacific Islander, 3.46% from other races, and 1.33% from two or more races. Hispanic or Latino of any race were 10.32% of the population.

There were 874 households, out of which 33.3% had children under the age of 18 living with them, 42.8% were married couples living together, 18.5% had a female householder with no husband present, and 35.2% were non-families. 31.2% of all households were made up of individuals, and 16.2% had someone living alone who was 65 years of age or older. The average household size was 2.48 and the average family size was 3.09.

In the city, the population was spread out, with 28.3% under the age of 18, 8.9% from 18 to 24, 25.5% from 25 to 44, 18.7% from 45 to 64, and 18.7% who were 65 years of age or older. The median age was 36 years. For every 100 females, there were 84.1 males. For every 100 females age 18 and over, there were 77.8 males.

The median income for a household in the city was $24,022, and the median income for a family was $30,029. Males had a median income of $29,663 versus $22,228 for females. The per capita income for the city was $12,109. About 27.7% of families and 27.6% of the population were below the poverty line, including 33.5% of those under age 18 and 32.3% of those age 65 or over

Education 
Malakoff's students are served by Malakoff Independent School District. In 2014–2015, Malakoff ISD served more than 1,200 students.

Climate
The climate in this area is characterized by hot, humid summers and generally mild to cool winters.  According to the Köppen Climate Classification system, Malakoff has a humid subtropical climate, abbreviated "Cfa" on climate maps.

References

External links

 City of Malakoff official website
 Information about Malakoff

Cities in Texas
Cities in Henderson County, Texas